The 1993 Swedish Golf Tour was the tenth season of the Swedish Golf Tour, a series of professional golf tournaments held in Sweden, Denmark and Finland.

Most of the tournaments also featured on the 1993 Challenge Tour (CHA).

Schedule
The season consisted of 10 events played between May and September.

Order of Merit

References

Swedish Golf Tour